The 2021 NCAA Women's Gymnastics Championships were held from April 16–17, 2021 at the Dickies Arena in Fort Worth, Texas. The semifinals and the national championship were televised on ESPN2 and ABC, respectively.

Regional championships
The top two teams from each region moved to the championship round, indicated in bold. The regional final competition began at 7 p.m. local time, April 3.

 Athens, Georgia (April 1–3)
Regional final teams: Florida* 197.700, Minnesota 197.425, Denver 197.275,  North Carolina State 196.150
 Morgantown, West Virginia (April 1–3)
Regional final teams: Michigan* 198.100, California 197.750, UCLA 197.275, Ohio State 195.625
 Salt Lake City, Utah (April 1–3)
Regional final teams: Utah* 197.925, LSU 197.750,	Arizona State 197.600, Kentucky 197.600
 Tuscaloosa, Alabama (April 1–3)
Regional final teams: Oklahoma* 198.175, Alabama 197.575, Arkansas 196.700, Missouri 196.550

* – Denotes regional champions

NCAA Championship
The top two teams from each semifinal advanced to the National Championship, which was televised live on ABC on April 17 at 3:30 pm ET.

Standings

Individual results

Medalists

All-around

References

2021 in American sports
NCAA Women's Gymnastics Championship
2021 NCAA Division I women's gymnastics season
NCAA Women's Gymnastics championship
Sports competitions in Fort Worth, Texas